Mielnik is a village and municipal seat in Podlaskie Voivodeship, north-east Poland.

Mielnik may also refer to the following places:
Mielnik, Lower Silesian Voivodeship (south-west Poland)
Mielnik, Subcarpathian Voivodeship (south-east Poland)
Mielnik, West Pomeranian Voivodeship (north-west Poland)
Gail McIntyre, Character in Coronation Street